Tupou College is a Methodist boys' secondary boarding school in Toloa on the island of Tongatapu, Tonga. It is located on the Eastern District of Tongatapu near the village of Malapo. The school is owned by the Free Weslyan Church of Tonga. Established in 1866 by James Egan Moulton, it claims to be the oldest secondary school in the Pacific Islands. Enrolment is some 1,000 pupils. Tupou College was first established at Nuku'alofa at the location on which Queen Salote College stands today. From there it moved to Nafualu, Sia'atoutai on the site where Sia’atoutai Theological College now stands. In 1948, the school last moved to Toloa in the Eastern District of Tongatapu where it still stands today. 

Tupou College's brother school is Newington College, located in Sydney, Australia. Rev Moulton was the founding headmaster of both Newington College and Tupou College.

Missionary A. Harold Wood was Principal from 1924 to 1937, during which time the school expanded from 30 students to almost 400. The first Tongan principal of the school was Rev. Sione Siupeli Taiamoni Taliai who was principal from 1970–1979.

The College has a  campus, on which crops of vegetables and fruit are grown. This includes an area of forest noted in Tonga as the Toloa Rainforest Reserve containing a variety of plant species endemic to Tonga as well as those no longer found in other parts of the kingdom. The forest is far smaller in size today then when they first moved there because of the construction of the airport, University of the Nations at Lafalafa and clearance for extra farmland. Tree planting projects have been carried out in the previous years within the forest to ensure the survival and continuous growth of the unique species found at Toloa.

Notable alumni
Taufa'ahau Tupou IV (1918-2006), the late King of Tonga, reigning from 1967–2006
Viliami Tangi, former Deputy Prime Minister and Health Minister
Willie Ofahengaue (b. 1968), professional Australian rugby union player
Saimone Taumoepeau (b. 1979), professional New Zealand rugby union player
Sione Lātūkefu (1927 - 1995), historian

Education
The school trains students in Christian discipleship through programs of worship, study, work and recreation. They stay within the campus from Saturdays to Fridays. All students are required to stay within the campus; the only exception being those possessing medical problems and difficulties.

School grades are from forms 1-7 (Year 7-13) including two technical classes where students learn engineering, motor repair, carpentry, metalwork, electrical engineering and art & design.

Students are also required to make some from a variety of Tongan Handicrafts including: polished coconut shells (for kava drinking) and kafa (waist ropes to hold ta'ovala). It is from this that students learn the art, traditional skills, and culture of Tonga also benefiting the school as it is sold in the college's annual bazaar.

Curriculum
As most schools in Tonga do, Tupou College follows the curriculum of the Tongan Ministry of Education which is based on the New Zealand Curriculum. Technical classes also offer courses where students can continue studies in New Zealand.

Magazine
Tupou College has a magazine published annually to record events and participation in the school. It is known as the Ko e Havea Magazine.

Principals
Before 1970, all of Tupou College's principals were Australian and were assigned to work in Tonga as missionaries. It was only in 1970 that Tupou College received its first Tongan principal, Rev. Siupeli T. Taliai, who served as principal for nine years; from 1970–1979.

House system
The school has 12 houses. They are:
John Thomas (first successful missionary in Tonga)
Harold Wood (after Rev. A. Harold Wood- former principal of the school)
Tevita Tonga (after Tevita Tonga Mohenoa - first dux and head tutor of the school)
'Aho'eitu (after Siaosi Manumataongo 'Alaivahamama'o 'Aho'eitu Konstantin Tuku'aho - an ex-student) 
Siupeli Taliai (first Tongan Principal) 
Kau Ta'e'iloa (to all unknown contributors to the School)
Howard Secomb (former principal of Tupou College)
Sau Faupula (former head tutor)
John Wesley (after John Wesley - founder of the Methodist Church)
Wood Gate (after Ronald Woodgate - former principal of school-1948)
Rodger Page (after Rodger Page - former principal and former president of the FWCT)
Sione Havea (longest head tutor)

Museum
Tukuaho Memorial Museum (Ko e Misiume Fakamanatu O Tukuaho) is a small museum in the campus which houses many important Tongan artifacts given to the museum by the Tongan royal family and by many others that exhibit the school's history as well as Tongan culture. Admission is free and visitors may contact the school to visit as the museum is only open by appointment.

References

External links
"Tupou College" at Tonga on the 'NET
tctscienceacademy.weebly.com

Educational institutions established in 1866
Methodism in Tonga
Methodist schools
Schools in Tonga
1866 establishments in Tonga
Tongatapu